Last Ounce of Courage is a 2012 American Christian Christmas drama film directed by Darrel Campbell and Kevin McAfee and starring Marshall R. Teague, Jennifer O'Neill, and Fred Williamson. It centers on the struggle of Bob Revere, a man dealing with what he feels is his freedom of religion being attacked by the government of his community and an ACLU-like group.

The film was universally panned by film critics and audiences.

Synopsis
After the death of his son Thomas, Bob Revere (Teague), the mayor of Mount Columbus, has to deal with politicians removing Christmas and starts a controversial protest.

Cast 
Marshall R. Teague as Bob Revere
Fred Williamson as Warren Hammerschmidt
Jennifer O'Neill as Dottie Revere
Hunter Gomez as Christian Revere
Jenna Boyd as Maddie Rogers
Nikki Novak as Kari Revere
Rusty Joiner as Greg Rogers
Benjy Gaither as Ernie
Austin Marks as Thomas Revere
Bill O'Reilly as himself

Theatrical run 

Box Office Mojo reported that unlike most Christian films that depend on word of mouth, commercials were run for Last Ounce of Courage. The website said this indicated that the opening was "probably a pretty serious financial disappointment".

Critical reception 

Last Ounce of Courage was universally panned by film critics. Rotten Tomatoes reports a 0% approval rating based on 16 reviews, with an average score of 2.49/10. At Metacritic, which assigns a weighted average rating out of 100 to reviews from mainstream critics, the film has received an average score of 11 based on 5 reviews. As The Washington Post puts it, "Its effectiveness depends entirely on the degree to which you already believe its talking points.”  Actor and activist Chuck Norris said of the film, "It was an easy choice to endorse this film because its message is consistent with my life principles and core values.”

Michael O'Sullivan of The Washington Post said it was "preaching to the choir". Robert Abele of the Los Angeles Times said of the film, "The patriot-packaged Last Ounce of Courage has been made with the conviction of true zealots, but also the competence of amateurs." In contrast, Movieguide, a conservative Christian film review site, says of the film, "Last Ounce of Courage ends on several positive notes that make it recommended viewing for everyone."

Lawsuit 
Last Ounce of Courage was the subject of a 2014 class action lawsuit.  The lawsuit alleges that the film's marketing team conducted a massive robocall advertising campaign, which was alleged to be in violation of the Telephone Consumer Protection Act.  In 2017, a federal judge awarded $32.4 million to the plaintiffs.

See also
 List of Christmas films

References

External links
 
 
 
 

2012 films
2012 independent films
2010s Christmas drama films
American Christmas drama films
American independent films
Films about Christianity
Films about evangelicalism
2012 drama films
2010s English-language films
2010s American films